Lai Chi Hung (born 19 November 1971) is a Hong Kong archer. He competed in the men's individual event at the 1988 Summer Olympics.

References

External links
 

1971 births
Living people
Hong Kong male archers
Olympic archers of Hong Kong
Archers at the 1988 Summer Olympics
Place of birth missing (living people)